

Bus Rapid Transit

Abandoned

Bus Rapid Transit using trolleybuses

See also 

 Transport in India
 Bus rapid transit
 List of bus rapid transit systems

References